FAU or Fau may refer to:

Education 
 Florida Atlantic University, in Boca Raton, Florida, U.S.
 University of Erlangen–Nuremberg, in Bavaria, Germany

People 
 Felix Anudike-Uzomah (born 2002), American football player
 André Fau (1896–1982), French visual artist and poet
 Fernand Fau (1858–1919), French illustrator and cartoonist
 Michel Fau (born 1964), French comedian

Places
 Le Fau, France
 Fau (river), in Haute-Saône, France

Politics 
 Uruguayan Anarchist Federation
 Free Workers' Union, a union in Germany
 Broad Front UNEN, a political coalition in Argentina

Other uses 
 FAU (gene), encoding 40S ribosomal protein S30
 Fau (letter), or digamma, an archaic letter of the Greek alphabet
 F. Arthur Uebel (FAU), German manufacturer of clarinets
 Friends' Ambulance Unit, a British ambulance service
 Uruguayan Air Force
 Automobile Federation of Ukraine
 Faujasite, a zeolite material

See also
 Big Fau, a fictional "Megadeus" robot in The Big O